Alyson Richman is an American writer best known for The Lost Wife, a tale of a husband and wife who are separated in a concentration camp during World War II and reunited 60 years later at their grandchildren's wedding.  Her novels have been published in more than 15 languages and have received both national and international acclaim.

Background
Richman graduated from Wellesley College in 1994 and received a Thomas J. Watson Fellowship.  She currently lives with her husband and two children on Long Island, New York.

Bibliography
The Mask Carver's Son: A Novel (Bloomsbury 2001)
The Rhythm of Memory (formerly entitled Swedish Tango: A Novel) (Simon & Schuster 2004)
The Last Van Gogh: A Novel (Berkley 2006)
The Lost Wife (Berkley 2012)
Saint-Exupéry
The Garden of Letters (Berkley 2014)
The Velvet Hours (Berkley 2016) 
The Secret of Clouds (Berkley 2019) 
The Thread Collectors (2022)

References

External links

American women novelists
21st-century American novelists
Writers from New York City
Wellesley College alumni
Living people
Year of birth missing (living people)
21st-century American women writers
Novelists from New York (state)